Miss Universe Puerto Rico 2018 the 63rd edition of Miss Universe Puerto Rico pageant. Danna Hernández of San Juan crowned Kiara Ortega of Rincón as her successor at the end of the event who will represent Puerto Rico at Miss Universe 2018 in Bangkok, Thailand. 29 contestants competed in this year's pageant.

Result

Placements

* - Voted into the Top 16 via online voting

** - Voted into the Top 6 via Twitter voting

Special Awards

Contestants
Official 29 finalists of Miss Universe Puerto Rico 2018:

See also

 Miss Universe Puerto Rico

References

Puerto Rico 2018
2018 beauty pageants